The 1930 Troy State Red Wave football team represented Troy State Teachers College (now known as Troy University) as an independent during the 1930 college football season. Led by Coach Baxter, the Trojans compiled an overall record of 1–2.

Schedule

References

Troy State
Troy Trojans football seasons
Troy State Trojans football